USS George Clymer (APA-27) was an  that saw service with the US Navy in four wars - World War II, the Chinese Civil War, the Korean War and the Vietnam War. It was named after United States Founding Father George Clymer.

George Clymer (AP-57) was laid down as African Planet under a Maritime Commission contract 28 October 1940 by Ingalls Shipbuilding of Pascagoula, Mississippi; launched 27 September 1941; renamed George Clymer 9 January 1942; acquired by the Navy 15 June 1942; and commissioned the same day.

World War II
George Clymer sailed 21 June via Charleston to Norfolk, Virginia where she arrived 30 July for training in Chesapeake Bay. She embarked 1,400 men of the 9th Infantry Division and departed 23 October for French Morocco.

Invasion of French Morocco
After joining Rear Admiral Monroe Kelley's Northern Attack Group off the Moroccan coast 7 November, at midnight 8 November she debarked assault troops on special net-cutting and scouting missions against garrisons at Mehedia and the fortress Kasba. Just before dawn the first wave of troops hit the beach and encountered resistance from the Vichy French. Enemy shore batteries fired on the assembled transports and straddled George Clymer before she opened the range. Hard fighting continued ashore until 11 November. George Clymer debarked troops, unloaded cargo, and treated casualties until 15 November when she sailed to Casablanca to complete offloading cargo. She departed for the United States the 17th, arriving at Norfolk 30 November.

Transfer to the Pacific
After embarking more than 1,300 Seabees, George Clymer sailed 17 December for the Pacific. One of the first transports to serve in both the Atlantic and Pacific, she reached Nouméa, New Caledonia, 18 January 1943; sailed 23 January for the Fiji Islands, and arrived Espiritu Santo, New Hebrides, 30 January. Redesignated (APA-27) on 1 February, she sailed in convoy 5 February for Guadalcanal, Solomons, where she arrived the 7th to debark reinforcements and embark casualties and Japanese prisoners of war. During almost the next 9 months she sailed the Southwest Pacific, carrying cargo and rotating troops from bases in New Zealand, New Caledonia, the New Hebrides, and the Fijis to Guadalcanal. On 19 April she evacuated 38 Chinese and Fijian women and children, who had hidden from the Japanese for more than a year, from Guadalcanal and transported them to Nouméa.

Invasion of Bougainville
As flagship of Rear Admiral Theodore Stark Wilkinson's 3rd Amphibious Force, George Clymer departed Guadalcanal 30 October for the invasion of Bougainville. Closing Cape Torokina 1 November, she disembarked men of the 2nd Marine Raider Battalion before joining other transports in a combined bombardment of enemy positions on Cape Torokina. She returned to Port Purvis on Florida Island in the Solomons, on 3 November; and during the next two months she made three runs to Bougainville, carrying reinforcements and cargo from the Fijis and Guadalcanal.

Invasion of the Marianas
George Clymer continued troop-carrying and supply runs in the Southwest Pacific until 4 June 1944 when she departed Guadalcanal for the invasion of the Marianas. Steaming via Kwajalein, she operated off Saipan from 17 to 30 June while serving as flagship of Rear Admiral Lawrence Fairfax Reifsnider's Southern Attack Group. She reached Eniwetok 4 July; departed 17 July for the assault against Guam - and arrived off Agat 21 July. After debarking assault troops, she served as receiving ship, boat pool tender, and medical station for the Southern Transport Group. She remained at Guam until 20 August; steamed via Saipan to Hawaii; and arrived Pearl Harbor 31 August.

Invasion of Leyte
Underway again 15 September, George Clymer steamed via Eniwetok and Manus, Admiralties, to the Philippines, where she landed nearly 1,000 troops at Dulag 21 October during the battle of Leyte. She returned to Manus 28 October; and, following a troop and cargo-carrying mission to New Britain and back, she sailed 11 November for the United States and arrived San Francisco 3 December for overhaul.

Invasion of Okinawa
Sailing 26 January 1945, she reached Guadalcanal 11 February and for more than a month trained for the invasion of Okinawa. She departed Ulithi, Carolines, in convoy 27 March; arrived off Hagushi 1 April; then debarked troops and unloaded cargo before departing 5 April. Steaming via Saipan and Pearl Harbor, she arrived San Francisco 9 May.

After conversion to a transport squadron and relief amphibious force flagship, she transported 1,200 Seabees to Pearl Harbor from 21 to 27 July. After returning to San Francisco 5 August with wounded veterans embarked, she sailed 12 August for the Philippines.

After hostilities
She reached Manila 7 September; embarked nearly 1,000 occupation troops of the 33rd Infantry Division; and transported them to Japan, arriving Wakayama 25 September. Between 3 and 21 October she made a similar voyage from Leyte to Japan; then, as part of the Operation Magic Carpet fleet, between 31 October and 14 November she carried more than 1,200 veterans from Saipan to San Francisco. Between 27 November and 28 December she cruised to Guam and Saipan and returned to San Pedro, California with homebound troops.

Postwar service

Atomic bomb tests

Prior to the Korean War, George Clymer supported various naval operations in the Pacific. From 1 June to 20 August she served at Bikini Atoll as flagship for Transport Division 11 during atomic bomb tests in the Marshall Islands.

Chinese Civil War

She conducted training operations along the Pacific coast until 15 December 1947 when she departed San Pedro for the Far East. Arriving Tsingtao, China, 20 January 1948, for more than six months she operated along the Chinese coast supporting the Nationalist Chinese troops during the Chinese Civil War. She departed Tsingtao 5 August; embarked troops at Guam, and transported them via the Panama Canal to Morehead City, North Carolina, where she arrived 17 September.

George Clymer returned to San Diego 4 October, and during the next 19 months she operated off the coast of Alaska, the West Coast, and in Hawaiian waters.

Korean War

After the invasion of South Korea by North Korean troops, she departed San Diego 14 July and carried units of the 5th Provisional Marine Brigade to Pusan, South Korea, where she debarked them 2 August to help stem the Communist advance at Masan. After returning to Yokosuka, Japan, 7 August, she embarked men of the 1st Marine Division at Kobe for the amphibious invasion at Inchon 15 September. Following the successful landings, she served as amphibious control and hospital ship before returning to Sasebo 29 September with casualties. She returned to Inchon 8 October to embark marines, and on 17 October she sailed for Wonsan, where she landed troops the 25th. Departing Wonsan 30 October, she steamed via Yokosuka to the United States and arrived San Diego 24 November.

George Clymer departed San Diego 4 June 1951 and, after embarking troops at San Francisco, she sailed 6 June for the Far East, arriving Yokosuka 20 June. During the next 10 months she supported the effort to repel Communist aggression in Korea; participated in amphibious landings along the Korean coast; rotated troops between Japan and Korea, and cruised Far Eastern waters from the Sea of Japan to the South China Sea to meet the demands of military forces in Asia. On 15 October she rescued nearly 500 survivors from a Japanese merchantman caught during a typhoon at Uku Shima, Japan. She departed Yokosuka 1 April 1952; returned to the United States for 7 months; then sailed from San Diego 12 November for a third deployment off Korea under the command of CAPT Edward J. O'Donnell. After reaching Yokosuka 29 November, she took part in troop-rotation runs between Korea and bases in Japan, Okinawa, and the Philippines. On 27 July 1953, as the armistice which brought an uncertain peace to Korea was signed at Panmunjom, she departed Yokosuka for the United States, arriving San Diego 22 August.

1950s
After the termination of hostilities in Korea, George Clymer deployed to the Far East on numerous occasions as an important unit of the 7th Fleet. Capable of carrying combat-ready troops to any beach in the Western Pacific and Southeast Asia, she provided vital support to the Fleet's operations.

Vietnam War
In August 1964 she cruised the South China Sea in an advanced state of readiness following the Gulf of Tonkin incident. During the summer of 1965 she deployed to South Vietnam, where she participated in amphibious landings at Da Nang and Chu Lai. She participated in further Vietnamese operations in the spring and summer of 1966. She transported marines from Hawaii to Okinawa in June 1965 in preparation for the 7th Marines' August landing in Chu Lai. Soon after departure from Hawaii, she broke down earning the Marines' title of "Greasy George."

Decommission
USS George Clymer was decommissioned on 31 October 1967 at San Diego. She was sold for scrapping to the National Metals & Steel Corporation on 26 July 1968, bringing to an end a long and distinguished 25-year career with the US Navy.

Awards
George Clymer received five battle stars for World War II service, seven for the Korean War and three for the Vietnam War.

References

External links

 

Arthur Middleton-class attack transports
Ships built in Pascagoula, Mississippi
1941 ships
World War II auxiliary ships of the United States
World War II amphibious warfare vessels of the United States
Cold War amphibious warfare vessels of the United States
Korean War amphibious warfare vessels of the United States
Vietnam War amphibious warfare vessels of the United States
Ships named for Founding Fathers of the United States